Mordella leucaspis is a species of beetle in the genus Mordellaof the family Mordellidae, part of the superfamily Tenebrionoidea. It was discovered in 1849.

Subspecies
The following subspecies have been described:
 Mordella leucaspis bicoloripilosa Horák, 1985
 Mordella leucaspis leucaspis Küster, 1849
= Mordella leucaspis adnexa Ermisch, 1969
= Mordella leucaspis persica Apfelbeck, 1914

Distribution
Beatles of this species live in Europe.

References

Beetles described in 1849
leucaspis